Note — many sporting events did not take place because of World War I

1916 in sports describes the year's events in world sport.

American football

College championship
 College football national championship – Pittsburgh Panthers
Events
 7 October — Georgia Tech Yellow Jackets defeats the Cumberland University Bulldogs by a score of 222–0, the most one-sided game in college football history.

Association football
Europe
 There is no major football in Europe due to World War I
South America
 9 July — CONMEBOL, the governing body of South American football, is founded

Australian rules football
VFL Premiership
 2 September: Fitzroy wins the 20th VFL Premiership: Fitzroy 12.13 (85) d Carlton 8.8 (56) at Melbourne Cricket Ground (MCG).  Fitzroy wins the title despite having finished last in the regular season.
South Australian Football League:
 not contested due to World War I
West Australian Football League:
 9 September: South Fremantle 7.12 (54) defeat East Fremantle 5.5 (35) for their first WAFL premiership.

Bandy
Sweden
 Championship final – IFK Uppsala 3–2 Djurgårdens IF

Baseball
World Series
 7–12 October — Boston Red Sox defeats the Brooklyn Robins by 4 games to 1 to win the 1916 World Series.
Events
 The Philadelphia Athletics finish the season with a record of 36–117 or a .235 winning percentage, the worst Major League Baseball record since 1900.
 Winnipeg Maroons wins the Northern League Championship
 The Federal League goes out of business in a settlement with organised baseball that leaves out one club; the Baltimore Terrapins pursue a legal remedy

Boxing
Events
 Having already lost to him earlier in the year, Battling Levinsky defeats Jack Dillon in 12 rounds at Boston to claim the World Light Heavyweight Championship.
 The series of fights between Ted "Kid" Lewis and Jack Britton continues with Britton taking the World Welterweight Championship into 1917.
Lineal world champions
 World Heavyweight Championship – Jess Willard
 World Light Heavyweight Championship – Jack Dillon → Battling Levinsky
 World Middleweight Championship – Al McCoy
 World Welterweight Championship – Ted "Kid" Lewis → Jack Britton
 World Lightweight Championship – Freddie Welsh
 World Featherweight Championship – Johnny Kilbane
 World Bantamweight Championship – Kid Williams
 World Flyweight Championship – Jimmy Wilde

Canadian football
Grey Cup
 not contested due to World War I

Cricket
Events
 There is no first-class cricket in England, Australia, New Zealand, South Africa or the West Indies due to World War I
India
 Bombay Quadrangular – Europeans

Cycling
Tour de France
 not contested due to World War I
Giro d'Italia
 not contested due to World War I

Figure skating
World Figure Skating Championships
 not contested due to World War I

Golf
Events
 The inaugural USPGA Championship is held as a matchplay tournament
Major tournaments
 British Open – not contested due to World War I
 June 29–30 — US Open – Chick Evans
 October 10–14 — USPGA Championship – Jim Barnes
Other tournaments
 British Amateur – not contested due to World War I
 US Amateur – Chick Evans

Horse racing
England
 Grand National – not held due to World War I
 1,000 Guineas Stakes – Canyon
 2,000 Guineas Stakes – Clarissimus
 The Derby – Fifinella
 The Oaks – Fifinella
 St. Leger Stakes – Hurry On
Australia
 Melbourne Cup – Sasanof
Canada
  King's Plate -  Mandarin
Ireland
 Irish Grand National – All Sorts
 Irish Derby Stakes – Furore 
USA
 May 13 — Kentucky Derby – George Smith
 Preakness Stakes – Damrosch
 Belmont Stakes – Friar Rock

Ice hockey
Stanley Cup
 Montreal Canadiens wins the National Hockey Association (NHA) championship
 Portland Rosebuds wins the Pacific Coast Hockey Association (PCHA) championship, the first United States team to do so
 20–30 March — Montreal Canadiens defeats Portland Rosebuds in the 1916 Stanley Cup Finals by 3 games to 2
Events
 Winnipeg 61st Battalion wins the Allan Cup

Motor racing

Olympic Games
1916 Summer Olympics
 The 1916 Summer Olympics, due to take place in Berlin, are cancelled due to World War I

Rowing
The Boat Race
 Oxford and Cambridge Boat Race – not contested due to World War I

Rugby league
England
 All first-class competitions are cancelled due to World War I
Australia
 NSW Premiership – Balmain 5–3 South Sydney (grand final)
New Zealand
1916 New Zealand rugby league season

Rugby union
Five Nations Championship
 Five Nations Championship series is not contested due to World War I

Speed skating
Speed Skating World Championships
 not contested due to World War I

Tennis
Australia
 Australian Men’s Singles Championship – not contested due to World War I
England
 Wimbledon Men's Singles Championship – not contested due to World War I
 Wimbledon Women's Singles Championship – not contested due to World War I
France
 French Men’s Singles Championship – not contested due to World War I
 French Women’s Singles Championship – not contested due to World War I
USA
 American Men's Singles Championship – Richard Norris Williams (USA) defeats Bill Johnston (USA) 4–6 6–4 0–6 6–2 6–4
 American Women’s Singles Championship – Molla Bjurstedt Mallory (Norway) defeats Louise Hammond Raymond (USA) 6–0 6–1
Davis Cup
 1916 International Lawn Tennis Challenge – not contested

References

 
Sports by year

el:Κατηγορία:Αθλητικά γεγονότα του 1916